Marc Perrenoud (born 1981) is a Swiss jazz pianist and composer.

Life and career
Perrenoud, who is Swiss, was born in Berlin in 1981. His first jazz recording was Stream Out in 2006. The trio of Perrenoud, Marco Müller (bass) and Cyril Regamey (drums) released Vestry Lamento in 2014 after being together for 7 years. It was their third album, following Logo and Two Lost Churches. The trio's sound was described by a reviewer for The Irish Times as "big-hearted, harmonically open music laid down over grooves from jazz and funk".

Discography
An asterisk (*) indicates that the year is that of release.

As leader/co-leader

References

1981 births
Perrenoud, Marc
Musicians from Geneva
Swiss jazz pianists
21st-century pianists